The English Club of Pau is a private social club in Pau, France. It owns and conserves a decorative arts and book collection listed as a French monument historique (ISMH). The English Club’s mission includes an annual open house during the Journées de Patrimoine (European Heritage Days) and for reserved non-profit group tours, conferences, member publications and club member activities, all concentrated on the education and promotion of Pau’s former Anglo-American Colony.  It is housed at the Villa Lawrance by the City of Pau.

History

A British Colony men’s reading room dating back to 1828 was chartered February 26, 1856 as the English Literary Society (Société Littéraire Anglaise) which became The English Club in 1859.
Originally, the club was located at la Place Royale. It then moved across the Place Royale in 1871 to the building that would be its home until 1957 when it moved into the main salon of the former Hotel Gassion. Addition moves in 1990 to the Villa Regina, then the Villa Riquoir in 1996. In 2002, the City of Pau agreed to host the English Club and its collections at Villa Lawrance.
For many years, members were permitted to list the English Club as the seat for sporting clubs, including the Pau Hunt, Polo Club and Pau Golf Club.

Collection

The collection includes 19th and early 20th century English language books (mostly housed at the municipal archives). The English Club’s art collection includes works by Allen Culpepper Sealy (1850-1927), Jean Heîd « Hed » (1890-1957), Harry La Montagne (1869-1959) Paul Mirat (1885 – 1966), Viscount Henri de Vaufreland (1873 – 1957) and Eugene Blocaille (1873 - 1961). It also includes horse racing, cross county and steeple chase memorabilia of the Pau Hunt and portraits of past members.

Notable members and Honored Guests 
 René d'Astorg (1860-1940) - explorer of the Pyranees
 Captain James Barrow (Founder) (died 1918) - British soldier, husband of Frances Elizabeth Barrow, pen name Aunt Fanny.
 Belle Baruch1  (1899-1964) - American equestrian, philanthropist
 James Gordon Bennett Jr. (1841-1918) - publisher of the New York Herald
 Sir Victor Brooke (1843-1891) - Anglo-Irish naturalist and baronet
 Coco Chanel (1883-1971) - French fashion designer
 Lord John Yarde-Buller, 2nd Baron Churston (1846-1910) - British peer and soldier.
 Lord Howth (1827-1909) - Irish peer
 Harry La Montagne (1869-1959) - French-American horse owner, artist, sculptor, war veteran and sportsman 
 Jasper Hall Livingston (1815-1900) - American horse owner, gentleman rider and sportsman
 Ward McAllister (1827-1895) -  popular arbiter of social taste in 19th-century America
 Sir Alfred Munnings (1878-1959) - English painter of horses
 Sir John Nugent, 3rd Baronet of Cloncoskoran (1849-1929) - lived at  Cloncoskoraine, County Waterford, Ireland; died at Pau
 Frederick Henry Prince (1860-1953) - American stockbroker, investment banker and financier
 Norman Prince (1887-1916) - American aviator 
 Charles Henry Ridgway (1897-1916) - British army
 Sir Henry Russell (1834–1909) - pioneer explorer of Pyrenees 
 General Thomas Montagu Steele (1820-1890) - British army officer
 Dr. Alexander Taylor (1802–1879) - Scottish physician and author
 Lt.-Col. John Talbot Darnley Talbot-Crosbie (1843-1899) - Justice of the Peace for County Kerry; lived at Ardfert Abbey, County Kerry; died at Pau
 William Knapp Thorn (1848-1910) - American champion polo player

Royal Visitors
Edward VII
The Prince of Wales, future Edward VIII

Notes

References

Clubs and societies in France
English diaspora
Pau, Pyrénées-Atlantiques